This list of Doraemon films features both feature-length and short films based on the manga and anime series Doraemon. Since 1980, all of these films to date have been released by Toho. Toho currently holds worldwide distribution and licensing rights for all of the films in the series.

At the Japanese box office, Doraemon had grossed more than  revenue and sold more than 100 million tickets by 2015, having surpassed Godzilla as the highest-grossing film franchise in Japan. , the Doraemon films have grossed a total of  worldwide. Doraemon is the highest-grossing anime film franchise of all time, the highest-grossing non-English film franchise, and one of the highest-grossing animated film franchises worldwide.

Feature films
Most of the original series films were directed by Tsutomu Shibayama. Shunsuke Kikuchi was the music and composer of the movies from the year 1980 to 2000, except the 1998 and 1999 movies, whose music was composed by Senri Ohe. Kikuchi was followed by Katsumi Horii for the movies of the years 2000-2004. The music for the films from 2006–17 are composed by Kan Sawada. Takayuki Hattori followed from 2018–present.

Special films

Short films
These short films were usually shown alongside the feature-length movies above. The specials were usually aired on TV and aren't included in the regular episode numbering.

 What Am I for Momotaro (ぼく、桃太郎のなんなのさ) - 1981
 Doraemon: Ken-chan's Adventure (ドラえもん ケンちゃんの冒険) - 1981
 Doraemon Meets Ninja Hattori (82お正月だよ！ドラえもん・怪物くん・忍者ハットリくん) - 1982
 Doraemon: Europe Rail Travel (藤子不二雄スペシャル ドラえもん・ヨーロッパ鉄道の旅) - 1983
 In A Thrilling, Solar Car (トキメキソーラーくるまによん) - 1992
 Doraemon: Nobita to Mirai Note (ドラえもん のび太と未来ノート) - 1994
 2112: The Birth of Doraemon (2112年ドラえもん誕生) - 1995
 Doraemon Comes Back (帰ってきたドラえもん) - 1998
 Doraemon: Nobita's the Night Before a Wedding (のび太の結婚前夜) - 1999
 A Grandmother's Recollections (おばあちゃんの思い出) - 2000
 Ganbare! Gian!! (Good Luck! Gian!!) (がんばれ!ジャイアン!!) - 2001
 The Day When I Was Born (ぼくの生まれた日) - 2002
 Doraemon's 25th Anniversary (ドラえもんアニバーサリー25) - 2004

Dorami-chan films
 Mini-Dora SOS!! (ミニドラSOS!!) - 1989
 Wow, The Kid Gang of Bandits (アララ少年山賊団!) - 1991
 Dorami-chan: Hello, Dynosis Kids!! (ハロー恐竜キッズ!!) - 1993
 A Blue Straw Hat (青いストローハット) - 1994

Dorami & Doraemons films
 Dorami & Doraemons: Robot School's Seven Mysteries (ロボット学校七不思議!?) - 1996
 Space Land's Critical Event (宇宙ランド危機イッパツ!) - 2001

The Doraemons films
The Puzzling Challenge Letter of the Mysterious Thief Dorapan (怪盗ドラパン謎の挑戦状!) - 1997
The Great Operating of Springing Insects! (ムシムシぴょんぴょん大作戦!) - 1998
Funny Candy of Okashinana!? (おかしなお菓子なオカシナナ?) - 1999
Doki Doki Wildcat Engine (ドキドキ機関車大爆走！) - 2000
Goal! Goal! Goal!! (ゴール!ゴール!ゴール!!) - 2002

F-Theater
The following short films have been shown or are being screened at the Fujiko F. Fujio theater (Fシアター) in Japan:
 
Doraemon and Perman Close Call!? (ドラえもん＆パーマン危機一髪!?) 2011
21 Emon & Doraemon: Welcome to Hotel Tsunesha (21エモン&ドラえもん ようこそ!ホテルつづれ屋へ) 2012
Susume Roboketto & Doraemon: Decisive Battle! Tornado Castle on the Cloud (すすめロボケット&ドラえもん 『「決戦！雲の上の竜巻城』) 2013
Doraemon & Chimpui: Eli-sama's gift of gifts for love" (ドラえもん&チンプイ 『エリ様 愛のプレゼント大作戦』) 2014
Kiteretsu Encyclopedia & Doraemon: Koro Assistance 's First Approach (キテレツ大百科＆ドラえもん 『コロ助のはじめてのおつかい』) 2015
Pokonyan & Doraemon: Here pure cat in Pompoko Nyan!? (ポコニャン＆ドラえもん 『ポンポコニャンで ここほれニャンニャン！？』) 2016
Umeboshi Denka & Doraemon: Papparopan's SuperPappa! (ウメ星デンカ＆ドラえもん 『パンパロパンの スッパッパ！』) 2017
Doraemon & F-character All-Stars: a big pinch in the lunar race!? (ドラえもん＆ F キャラオールスターズ 『月面レースで大ピンチ！？』) 2019
Doraemon's Birth / Nobita the star? (『ドラえもん誕生』『セイカイはのび太？』) 2020; a double-feature.
Doraemon & F-character All-Stars: Slightly Mysterious Bullet Train (Express)! (ドラえもん＆Fキャラオールスターズ 『すこし不思議超特急（エクスプレス）』！) 2021

Box office performance

Notes

References

Lists of films based on manga
Lists of anime films

Films
Doraemon films
Lists of films by franchise